Marvin John Nance (December 21, 1943 – December 30, 1996) was an American actor. A longtime collaborator of filmmaker David Lynch, Nance portrayed the lead in Lynch's directorial film debut Eraserhead (1977). He continued to work with Lynch throughout his career, including as a series regular on the ABC mystery drama Twin Peaks (1990–1991).

Early life
Nance was born in Boston, Massachusetts and was raised in Dallas, Texas. He graduated from South Oak Cliff High School. Nance worked for some time with the American Conservatory Theater in San Francisco. In the 1970s, Nance met David Lynch, who cast him as the lead in Eraserhead.

Later career
After Eraserhead, he remained on good terms with Lynch, who cast him in nearly all of his projects:

 Dune (1984): a small role as the Harkonnen Captain Iakin Nefud.
 Blue Velvet (1986): a supporting role as Paul, a friend of Frank Booth.
 The Cowboy and the Frenchman (1988): plays Pete, one of the cowboys.
 Wild at Heart (1990): a small role as "00 Spool".
 Twin Peaks (1990–91): as Pete Martell, the henpecked sawmill gaffer.
 Twin Peaks: Fire Walk with Me (1992): reprised his role as Pete Martell, but his scenes were deleted.
 Lost Highway (1997): a small role as a garage mechanic named Phil (his final acting role).
 Twin Peaks: The Missing Pieces (2014): deleted scenes from Fire Walk with Me were released in 2014 as its own film.
 Twin Peaks (2017): footage featuring Nance from the pilot episode of the original series was used in "Part 17", which was dedicated to Nance.

Nance guest-starred on a 1995 episode of My So-Called Life entitled "Weekend", in which he played an innkeeper. He appeared with actress Mary Woronov in Suicidal Tendencies' 1983 "Institutionalized" music video.

Personal life
Nance married Catherine E. Coulson in 1968. They divorced in 1976. In May 1991, he married Kelly Jean Van Dyke, who worked in the adult film industry under the name Nancee Kelly. Van Dyke was the daughter of Jerry Van Dyke (briefly making Nance his son-in-law) and niece of Dick Van Dyke.

Second wife's suicide
Van Dyke died by suicide on November 17, 1991. According to her younger brother Ronald, Nance, who was in Bass Lake, California, filming Meatballs 4 at the time, attempted to console her on the phone as she threatened suicide. After a lightning storm knocked out the phones in Bass Lake, Nance and the director, Bobby Logan, found a deputy sheriff who contacted Los Angeles police and the apartment manager. They broke in and found that she had hanged herself.

Death
On December 29, 1996, Nance lunched with friends Leo Bulgarini and Catherine Case. Nance had a visible "crescent shaped bruise" under his eye; and, when asked about it, he related to them the story about a brawl outside a Winchell's Donuts store that morning. He described the incident as, "I guess I got what I deserved." He went home, complaining of a headache.

The injuries he sustained caused a subdural hematoma, resulting in his death the following morning. His body was discovered on the bathroom floor of his South Pasadena, California apartment by Bulgarini, on December 30, 1996. An autopsy revealed that the actor's blood alcohol level was 0.24% at the time of his death.

Legacy
The song "I Gotta Move" by Frank Black and the Catholics, from their 1997 eponymous debut album, refers to the circumstances of Nance's death, as well as the murder of Peter Ivers, who composed and performed the song "In Heaven, Everything is Fine" from Eraserhead.

A documentary about Nance funded by Lynch, titled I Don't Know Jack, was released in 2002.

Part 17 of Twin Peaks: The Return was dedicated to Nance.

Filmography

Film

 Fools (1970) – Hippie
 Jump (1971) – Ace
 Eraserhead (1977) – Henry Spencer
 Breaker! Breaker! (1977) – Burton
 Hammett (1982) – Gary Salt
 Dune (1984) – Nefud
 City Heat (1984) – Aram Strossell, the Bookkeeper
 Johnny Dangerously (1984) – Priest
 Ghoulies (1985) – Wolfgang
 Blue Velvet (1986) – Paul
 Barfly (1987) – Detective
 Colors (1988) – Officer Samuels
 The Blob (1988) – Doctor
 Wild at Heart (1990) – 00 Spool
 The Hot Spot (1990) – Julian Ward
 Whore (1991) – Man Who Helps Liz
 Motorama (1991) – Motel Clerk
 Meatballs 4 (1992) – Neil Peterson
 Twin Peaks: Fire Walk with Me (1992) – Pete Martell (scenes deleted)
 Love and a .45 (1994) – Justice Thurman
 The Demolitionist (1995) – Father McKenzie
 Across the Moon (1995) – Old Cowboy
 Voodoo (1995) – Lewis
 The Secret Agent Club (1996) – Doc
 Little Witches (1996) – Father Michael
 Lost Highway (1997) – Phil (final film role)
 Twin Peaks: The Missing Pieces (2014) – Pete Martell (deleted scenes from Fire Walk with Me)

Television
 Weekend (1984)
 Crime Story (1 episode, 1987) – Charlie Green
 Tricks of the Trade (1988) – Al
 Twin Peaks (27 episodes, 1990–91) – Pete Martell
 Another Midnight Run (1994) – Reilly
 My So-Called Life (1 episode, 1995) – Warren
 Fallen Angels (1 episode, 1995) – Sheriff
 Assault on Dome 4 (1996) – Mellow, Dome 4 Oldtimer
 Twin Peaks (1 episode, 2017) – Pete Martell (archive footage)

Music videos
 "Institutionalized" (Suicidal Tendencies music video, 1983)

References

External links
 
 Jack Nance Eraserhead Interview

1943 births
1996 deaths
American male film actors
American male stage actors
Male actors from Boston
Male actors from Dallas
20th-century American male actors
American male television actors
Van Dyke family
Accidental deaths in California
Deaths from head injury